</noinclude>

American Soul is an American musical drama television series, created by Jonathan Prince and Devon Greggory, that premiered on February 5, 2019, on BET. The series tells the story of Don Cornelius and the creation of his legendary music and dance program Soul Train and it stars an ensemble cast including Sinqua Walls, Jason Dirden, Iantha Richardson, Christopher Jefferson, Katlyn Nichol, Jelani Winston, and Kelly Price. In April 2019, it was renewed for a second season, which premiered on May 27, 2020.

Premise
American Soul tells the story of Don Cornelius, "his Soul Train dancers, crew and musicians in a cutthroat Hollywood in the 1970s and how they worked, played, rose and fell against the backdrop of the show that was most responsible for the way African-American culture was perceived by the world then."

The first season takes place between the first two seasons of Soul Train between 1971 and 1973. The second season jumps ahead two years later in 1975.

Cast and characters

Main
 Sinqua Walls as Don Cornelius
 Jason Dirden as Gerald Aims
 Jelani Winston as Kendall Clarke (season 1) 
 Christopher Jefferson as Jeffrey "JT" Tucker
 Iantha Richardson as Tessa Lorraine
 Kelly Price as Brianne Clarke
 Katlyn Nichol as Simone Clarke
 India McGee as Flo, a dancer on Soul Train 
 Perri L. Camper as Delores Cornelius, Don's former first wife

Recurring
 Kelly Rowland as Gladys Knight (season 1)
 Shannon Kane as Ilsa Dejarnette, a vindictive lawyer for Motown 
 Javon Johnson as George Johnson, founder of Afro and Ultra Sheen and a close friend of Don's (season 1, guest season 2)
 Jared Warren as Johnnie Cochran
 Phillip Mullings Jr. as Patrick Lorriane, a LAPD detective and husband of Tessa (season 1) 
 Simeon Daise as Reggie Michaels, revolutionary gangster
 Joseph Lee Anderson as Joseph Clarke, a Vietnam veteran, husband of Brianne, and father of Simone and Kendall, who is killed while on a tour of duty in Vietnam
 James Devonti as Brooks Donald, a slightly bigoted business partner of Don's
 Shannon Wallace as Private Nate Barker (season 1)
 Njema Williams as Uncle Pete (season 1)
 Christopher B. Duncan as Ray Bradley (season 2)
 Candace West as TBA, girlfriend of JT, rival of Simone Clarke (season 2) 
 Kearran Giovanni as Ruby Daniels, an acquaintance of Don and ex-wife of Gerald. (season 2)
 Michael Christopher Rodney as Woody Harley, ex-lover of Simone Clarke, rival of JT (season 2)

Guest

Season 1
 Michelle Williams as Diana Ross
 Bobby Brown as Rufus Thomas
 Gabrielle Dennis as Tina Turner
 McKinley Freeman as Ike Turner
 K. Michelle as Martha Reeves
 Wayne Brady as Little Richard

Season 2
 Darius McCrary as James Brown
 Ledisi as Patti LaBelle
 Big Boi as George Clinton
 Tone Bell as Richard Pryor
 Melanie Fiona as Chaka Khan
 Demetria McKinney as June Pointer 
 Yung Joc as Garry Shider 
 London Brown as Bootsy Collins
 DC Young Fly as Sly Stone
 Hudson Thames as Elton John
 Alex Ball as Dick Clark

Episodes

Season 1 (2019)

Season 2 (2020)

Production

Development
On April 10, 2018, it was announced that BET had given a series order to the production for a first season consisting of ten episodes. Executive producers are set to include Jesse Collins, Jonathan Prince and Devon Greggory. Tony Cornelius will co-executive produce alongside Andy Horne. Greggory will write the pilot episode and Jesse Collins Entertainment will produce. On September 4, 2018, it was confirmed that Greggory and Prince had created the series and that Prince would also co-write the pilot episode. On November 25, 2018, it was announced that the series would premiere on February 5, 2019. On April 2, 2019, it was announced that the series was renewed for a second season which will premiere on May 27, 2020.

Casting
In September 2018, it was announced that Sinqua Walls, Jason Dirden, Iantha Richardson, Christopher Jefferson, Katlyn Nichol, Jelani Winston, and Kelly Price had been cast in series regular roles and that Kelly Rowland would appear in a recurring capacity. On October 12, 2018, it was reported that Shannon Kane and Perri Camper had been cast in recurring roles. On December 21, 2018, it was announced that Michelle Williams, Bobby Brown, Gabrielle Dennis, McKinley Freeman, and K. Michelle would make guest appearances.

Filming
Principal photography for the series commenced in Atlanta, Georgia on September 17, 2018 and was scheduled to last until December 2018. In September 2018, filming for the series transpired at Pullman Yard on September 17, in Downtown Atlanta on September 18th, at the Atlanta Motor Speedway on September 19, and at Armour Yard on September 20th. In October 2018, filming continued in Atlanta with shooting taking place at Pullman Yard on October 7 and at the Bitsy Grant Tennis Center in Buckhead on October 27. In November 2018, filming occurred in Sandy Springs, Georgia on November 9 with shooting place at a Robert Green designed private home and in Downtown Atlanta on November 27. In December 2018, the production was working out of Palmetto on December 10 and 11.

Release

Marketing
On November 25, 2018, a teaser trailer for the series premiered during the 31st Soul Train Awards.

Premiere
On January 29, 2019, the series held its New York premiere at the New World Stage in New York City. Those in attendance included BET Networks President Scott Mills, executive producer Tony Cornelius, and actors Sinqua Walls, Kelly Price, Jason Dirden, Naturi Naughton, Jelani Winston, Katlyn Nichol, Shannon Wallace, Christopher Jefferson, and Iantha Richardson.

On February 4, 2019, the series held its Los Angeles premiere at the Wolf Theatre in Los Angeles, California. Those in attendance included Sinqua Walls, Jason Dirden, Tami Roman, McKinley Freeman, Tank, Robert Townsend, Vanessa Bell Calloway, Tommy Davidson, Darrin Dewitt Henson, Tony Cornelius, Christina Cornelius, Scott Mills, Leon Robinson, Kenny Burns, Jesse Collins, Christopher Jefferson, Candace West, Katlyn Nichol, Iantha Richardson and India McGee.

Reception
The series has been met with a positive response from critics upon its premiere. Metacritic, which uses a weighted average, assigned the series a score of 70 out of 100 based on 4 critics, indicating "generally favorable reviews."

The series was submitted by BET for fourteen categories at the 71st Primetime Emmy Awards, but none were selected. Kelly Rowland received a nomination for Outstanding Guest Performance in a Comedy or Drama Series at the NAACP Image Awards.

References

External links

2010s American drama television series
2019 American television series debuts
American biographical series
BET original programming
English-language television shows
Television series set in the 1970s
Soul Train